Robert Ylagan Arevalo (born May 6, 1938) is a Filipino film and television actor.

Personal life
Arevalo is the son of Filipino film actor/composer/musician Tito Arevalo; his uncle Angel Esmeralda is the father of the late Jay Ilagan and his uncle Gerardo de León is a national artist and an award winning movie director. He attended some of the best schools in Manila such as Legarda Elementary School, San Beda College and Ateneo de Manila where he took Business Administration. On August 11, 1962, he married Barbara Perez.

Selected filmography

Film
The Portrait (2017)
Where I Am King (2014)
The Healing (2012)
Sagrada Familia (2009)
Dukot (2009)
Sabungero (2009)
Fuchsia (2009)
Gulong (2007)
Paraiso: Tatlong Kwento ng Pag-Asa (2007)
Madame X (2000) as Don Justo Florendo
Isusumbong Kita sa Tatay Ko... (1999) as Alfredo
Birador (1998) as Mario
Damong Ligaw (1997)
Tirad Pass: The Last Stand of Gen. Gregorio del Pilar (1996)
Mulanay: Sa Pusod ng Paraiso (1996)
Sa Aking Mga Kamay (1996)
Matimbang Pa sa Dugo (1995)
Bocaue Pagoda Tragedy (1995)
The Lilian Velez Story: Till Death Do Us Part (1995)
The Maggie dela Riva Story (God... Why Me?) (1994)
Maalaala Mo Kaya: The Movie (1994)
The Untold Story: Vizconde Massacre II - May The Lord Be With Us (1994)
The Vizconde Massacre Story (God Help Us!) (1993)
Alejandro "Diablo" Malubay (1993)
Aguila at Guerrero: Droga Terminators (1992) 
Uubusin Ko Ang Lahi Mo! (1991)
Ama... Bakit Mo Ako Pinabayaan? (1990)
Captain Jaylo Batas sa Batas (1989) as Major Mendoza
Bagong Hari (1986)
Miguelito: Batang Rebelde (1985)
Working Girls (1984)
Divorce Filipino Style (1976)
Ang Daigdig ng Mga Api (1965)
The Ravagers (1965)
El filibusterismo (1962)
The Moises Padilla Story (1961)
Noli Me Tángere (1961)

Television

Awards

References

1938 births
Living people
ABS-CBN News and Current Affairs people
ABS-CBN personalities
GMA Network personalities
Ateneo de Manila University alumni
Filipino male film actors
Filipino television news anchors
San Beda University alumni
Filipino male television actors